Yowrie River, a perennial river of the Tuross River catchment, is located in the upper ranges of the South Coast region of New South Wales, Australia.

Course and features
Yowrie River rises on the eastern slopes of the Badja Range within Wadbilliga National Park, southwest of Cobargo and flows generally northeast, north, northeast, and then north northwest, joined by one minor tributary before reaching its confluence with the Wadbilliga River below Belowra Mountain. The river descends  over its  course.

See also

 Rivers of New South Wales
 List of rivers of New South Wales (L–Z)
 List of rivers of Australia

References

External links
 

 

Rivers of New South Wales
South Coast (New South Wales)